is a city located in Ishikawa Prefecture, Japan. , the city had an estimated population of 52,143 in 23,111 households, and a population density of 3,800 persons per km².

Geography
Nonoichi is in central Ishikawa Prefecture, sandwiched between the geographically much larger cities of Kanazawa and Hakusan. The city is located on flatlands on the fertile floodplain of the Tedori River

Neighbouring municipalities 
Ishikawa Prefecture
Kanazawa
Hakusan

Demographics
Per Japanese census data, the population of Nonoichi has grown rapidly over the past 50 years.

Climate
Nonoichi has a humid continental climate (Köppen Cfa) characterized by mild summers and cold winters with heavy snowfall.  The average annual temperature in Nonoichi is 14.3 °C. The average annual rainfall is 2,542 mm with September as the wettest month. The temperatures are highest on average in August, at around 26.8 °C, and lowest in January, at around 3.0 °C.

History 
The area around Nonoichi was part of ancient Kaga Province. The area became part Kaga Domain under the Edo period Tokugawa shogunate, and nonoichi was a post station on the Hokuriku kaidō highway. Following the Meiji restoration, the area was organised into Ishikawa District, Ishikawa. The village of Nonoichi was established with the creation of the modern municipalities system on April 1, 1889. It was raised to town status on July 1, 1924. A referendum to merge with the city of Kanazawa was rejected in 1937. On April 1, 1955, Nonoichi expanded by annexing the neighbouring village of Tomioka. Nonoichi was elevated to city status on November 11, 2011. Ishikawa District was dissolved as a result of this merger.

Government
Nonoichi has a mayor-council form of government with a directly elected mayor and a unicameral city legislature of 15 members.

Economy 
Nonoichi is primarily a bedroom community for the city of Kanazawa. Local industries include agriculture and food processing.

Education

College and university
 Kanazawa Institute of Technology
 Ishikawa Prefectural University

Primary and secondary education
Nonoichi has five public elementary schools and two middle schools operated by the city government, and one public high school operated by the Ishikawa Prefectural Board of Education. The prefecture also operates one special education school.

Transportation

Railway
  West Japan Railway Company - Hokuriku Main Line
 
 Hokuriku Railroad Ishikawa Line
 -  -

Highway

Sister city relations
  - Gisborne New Zealand, from 1990 
 -Shenzhen, China, friendship city

Local attractions
Okyōzuka Site, a Jomon period archaeological site and National Historic Site
Suematsu temple ruins, a National Historic Site

References

External links

  

 
Cities in Ishikawa Prefecture